University of Applied Sciences Technikum Vienna (German: Fachhochschule Technikum Wien) was founded in 1994 and became Vienna’s first university of applied sciences in 2000. It is the largest technical university of applied sciences in Austria and offers twelve bachelor's degree and eighteen master's degree programs.

Since 2012, UAS Technikum has been a member of the European University Association (EUA). In October 2008, UAS Technikum opened a second location in the passive office building ENERGYbase in Floridsdorf, Vienna and following that, in 2013 a comprehensive expansion of the main location at Höchstädtplatz in Vienna's 20th district Brigittenau was completed.

In December 2015, UAS Technikum was awarded the Erasmus+ Award 2015 in the category of Higher Education. It has also been awarded the first place in the annual UAS ranking conducted by the Austrian Industry Magazine, most notably in 2015 and 2021.

With around 12,000 graduates and around 4,400 students, UAS Technikum is the largest provider of technical studies at universities of applied sciences in Austria. It is also a network partner of FEEI (Fachverband der Elektro- und Elektronikindustrie).

In April 2021, FH-Prof. Dr. Sylvia Geyer was appointed to succeed FH-Prof. DI Dr. Fritz Schmöllebeck as the rector of UAS Technikum, acting as of September 1, 2021.

Degree Programmes 
UAS Technikum offers 12 bachelor's and 18 master's degree programs. Depending on the program, studies can be completed either full-time, part-time or in distance learning.

Bachelor's Programmes 

 Biomedical Engineering (full-time)
 Business Informatics (full-time, part-time)
 Computer Science (full-time, dual)
 Electronics (full-time)
 Electronics and Business (part-time)
 Human Factors and Sports Engineering (full-time)
 Information and Communication Systems (part-time)
 International Industrial Engineering (part-time)
 Mechatronics and Robotics (full-time)
 Mechanical Engineering (full-time)
 Smart Homes and Assistive Technologies (full-time)
 Urban Renewable Energy Technologies (full-time)

Master's Programmes 

 Business Information Systems (part-time)
 Data Science (part-time)
 Ecotoxicology & Environmental Management (part-time)
 Embedded Systems (part-time)
 Game Engineering and Simulation (full-time)
 Health and Rehabilitation Technology (full-time)
 Information Systems Management (distance learning)
 Information Systems Management - Double Degree Programme (part-time)
 Innovation and Technology Management (part-time)
 Integrative Urban Development - Smart City (part-time)
 International Industrial Engineering (part-time)
 IT Security (part-time)
 Mechanical Engineering - Digitalised Product Development & Simulation (full-time)
 Mechatronics and Robotics (full-time, part-time)
 Medical Engineering & eHealth (full-time)
 Power Electronics (Part-time)
 Urban Renewable Energy Systems (part-time)
 Software Engineering (part-time)
 Sports Technology (full-time)
 Telecommunications and Internet Technologies (part-time)
 Tissue Engineering and Regenerative Medicine (part-time)

Research and Development 
The following thematic focal points form the strategic framework and focus for research at the UAS Technikum:

 Automation and Robotics: Projects in the fields of Industry 4.0, 3D printing and bioplastics.
 Embedded Systems and Cyber-Physical Systems: The focus areas are primarily related to platforms and development tools for intelligent products as well as the application domains of smart homes and assistive technologies.
 Renewable Urban Energy Systems: The focus is on urban technologies and on the cities of the future as well as on questions regarding mobility.
 Data-driven, Secure and Smart Systems: Focus on the exchange, interoperability, use of health data, but not only in ambient assisted living.
 Tissue Engineering and Molecular Life Science Technologies: The applications range from the regeneration of joints in the body all the way to various types of material coatings for industrial applications.

In addition, staff at UAS Technikum conduct research on other technologies and work on projects in subject areas such as telecommunications, security and usability.

References

External links 
 

Universities of Applied Sciences in Austria
Brigittenau